Seosan Song clan was one of the Korean clans. Their Bon-gwan was in Seosan, South Chungcheong Province. According to the research in 2000, the number of Seosan Song clan is 2713. Their founder was  who was a descendant of Song Ju eun.

See also 
 Korean clan names of foreign origin

References

External links 
 

 
Korean clan names of Chinese origin